Bulgarian United Communist Party (Bulgarian: Българска единна комунистическа партия) was a political party in Bulgaria. The party was founded on December 11, 1993. It was led by Atanas Vasilev and Mihail Mihaylov.  Its formation was published in the State Gazette in 1994.

In 2000 the party merged into the Communist Party of Bulgaria.

References

Defunct political parties in Bulgaria
Communist parties in Bulgaria
Defunct communist parties
Marxist parties in Bulgaria
Political parties established in 1993
1993 establishments in Bulgaria
Political parties disestablished in 2000
2000 disestablishments in Bulgaria